The Toronto Golf Club is a private golf club in Mississauga, Ontario, Canada, a suburban municipality adjacent to Toronto. Established in Toronto in 1876, the Toronto Golf Club is the third oldest golf club in North America after Royal Montreal Golf Club, and the Royal Quebec Golf Club. In 1909, the golf club adopted its present name. The golf club moved to its present location in the early 20th century. The Toronto Golf Club has hosted the Canadian Open five times; and the Canadian Amateur Championship nine times, more than any other club.

History

It originated on a parcel of land known as the Fernhill property, which was included within the city of Toronto in the 1900s.  In 1909, the Club obtained a new charter without share capital, and the original name of the Club, "The Toronto Golf Club", was restored. The following year it was decided to acquire a new site in Toronto Township, now Mississauga.

The Club is located on the banks of the Etobicoke River, and its 18-hole course was designed by the renowned English architect Harry Colt.  The course was ready for play in the fall of 1912, and its clubhouse was completed in 1913. In 1919, the Club bought additional land to the north and had a new nine-hole course built which opened in 1921. George Cumming was hired in 1900, at age 21, to serve as head professional and remained in that position for 50 years.  Doug Rankin, is the current Head Professional and only the fifth Pro in the Club's history.  Hired in 1991, Rankin took over from Mr. John Hunt, who was the Professional from 1959- 1990.  Mr. Lou Cumming, Professional 1950-1959; George Cumming, Professional 1900-1950; Arthur Smith, Professional 1895-1899.

Tournaments hosted
The Toronto Golf Club has hosted several major events in its history. The golf club was a former rota course of the Canadian Open, hosting the event on five occasions. It hosted the event twice at its original location in Toronto (1905 and 1909), and hosted the event three more times at its current location in 1914, 1921 and 1927. The Toronto Golf Club has also hosted the Canadian Amateur Championship nine times, more than any other club. The golf club played host to the tournament in 1898, 1901, 1903, 1905, 1909, 1913, 1926, 1995, and 2017.

References

External links
 
 

Golf clubs and courses in Ontario
Sport in Mississauga
Golf clubs and courses designed by Harry Colt
1876 establishments in Ontario